Shan Yang (born 13 February 1963) is a Chinese engineer who is president and deputy party secretary of Hunan Academy of Agricultural Sciences, and an academician of the Chinese Academy of Engineering.

Biography 
Shan was born in You County, Hunan, on 13 February 1963. He graduated from Huazhong Agricultural University in July 1984. In 1986, the Communist government sent him to study at the Institute of Agricultural Chemistry and Food Technology, National Research Council of Spain. In May 2020, he rose to become president and Chinese Communist Party Deputy Committee Secretary of Hunan Academy of Agricultural Sciences.

Honours and awards 
 18 November 2021 Member of the Chinese Academy of Engineering (CAE)

References 

1963 births
Living people
People from You County
Engineers from Hunan
Huazhong Agricultural University alumni
Members of the Chinese Academy of Engineering